This is a list of the busiest airports in Australia by passenger traffic and aircraft movements.

At a glance

Top 10 airports by passenger movements 1985–86 to 2021–22 
This is a list of the busiest airports in Australia by passenger movements (both inbound and outbound) compiled by the Bureau of Infrastructure, Transport and Regional Economics. All passenger numbers are listed in thousands.

Note: Prior to the COVID-19 Pandemic, Darwin International Airport, Northern Territory was ranked 10.

Top 10 airports by aircraft movements in 2000–2015 calendar years
This is a list of the busiest airports in Australia by aircraft movements compiled by Airservices Australia. This list includes regular public transport operations and private operations.

Top 50 airports by revenue passenger traffic in 2014–15
This list shows revenue passenger traffic by airport. It is compiled from the Bureau of Infrastructure, Transport and Regional Economics. Note: data not available for Avalon Airport; regular public transport operations only.

See also
List of airports in Australia

References

Busiest
Australia